Keşişkənd (also, Keshishkend) is a village in the Gadabay District of Azerbaijan.

References 

Populated places in Gadabay District